The Dead & Company Summer Tour 2016 was a concert tour by the rock band Dead & Company during June and July 2016. It was the band's second tour, following their 2015 tour. At the band's final show for the 2015 tour at The Forum in Inglewood, California, John Mayer hinted that the band would continue touring in 2016, stating at the conclusion of the show, "At the risk of rocking any boats—known and unknown—we'll see you next year."

During the hiatus between the two tours, the band played a free show on May 23, 2016 in San Francisco.

Overview
The Dead & Company Summer Tour 2016 took place between June 9 and July 30, 2016, comprising a total of 24 concerts in 20 different cities (including performances at three different baseball and football stadiums).  The band was one of the headliners at the 2016 Bonnaroo Music Festival.

The tour ended with the July 30 show at the Shoreline Amphitheatre in Mountain View, California. The final concert on the east coast was on July 16 at Fenway Park in Boston, Massachusetts. During the course of their career, the Grateful Dead never performed at Fenway Park, and these concerts marked the first shows ever performed there by members of the former band.

Prior to the tour, the band had two public performances in 2016:  a promotional appearance on February 18 on The Tonight Show Starring Jimmy Fallon, and a free show on May 23 at The Fillmore in San Francisco, for which in lieu of payment the band asked attendees to "pay it forward" in some way.

Former Grateful Dead vocalist Donna Jean Godchaux-MacKay sat in with the band at their performance on June 12 at the Bonnaroo Music Festival as well as their performances on June 25 and 26 at Citi Field in Flushing, NY and on July 15 and 16 at Fenway Park in Boston, MA.

Tour dates
The band performed a total of 24 concerts in 20 different U.S. cities.

Musicians
Mickey Hart – drums, percussion
Bill Kreutzmann – drums
John Mayer – lead guitar, lead/backing vocals
Bob Weir – rhythm guitar, lead/backing vocals
Oteil Burbridge – bass guitar, percussion, backing vocals
Jeff Chimenti – keyboards, backing vocals
With:
Donna Jean Godchaux - Vocals (some dates)

See also
 Fare Thee Well: Celebrating 50 Years of the Grateful Dead
 Reunions of the Grateful Dead

References

External links
Dead & Company official website

2016 concert tours
Dead & Company concert tours